Papilio luzviae is a species of swallowtail butterfly from the genus Papilio that is found on Marinduque in the Philippines.

References

luzviae
Butterflies described in 1991
Fauna of Marinduque